Hjaðningavíg (the 'battle of the Heodenings'), the legend of Heðinn and Hǫgni or the Saga of Hild is a Germanic heroic legend about a never-ending battle which is documented in Sörla þáttr, Ragnarsdrápa, Gesta Danorum, Skíðaríma and in Skáldskaparmál. It is also held to appear on the image stone at Stora Hammar on Gotland (see illustration). Moreover, it is alluded to in the Old English poems Deor and Widsið, and in the Old Norse Háttalykill inn forni, and a version of it survived down to the 18th century in the traditional Norn language ballad "Hildina". An altered version of the saga is found in the Middle High German poem Kudrun, as a prologue to the story of Kudrun herself. Yet another version is found in the Old Yiddish Dukus Horant.

Like the names Heðinn (O.E. Heoden) and Hǫgni (O.E. Hagena), the legend is believed to have continental Germanic origins.

Edda and Ragnarsdrápa

In the Skáldskaparmál and in Ragnarsdrápa, it is related that once when Hǫgni was away, his daughter Hildr was kidnapped by a prince named Heðinn, the son of Hjarrandi (O.E. Heorrenda). When Hǫgni came back, he immediately started to search for her. In the older poem Ragnarsdrápa, Hǫgni finally found her and the island where Heðinn waited with his army. This island is explained as the island of Hoy in Orkney by Snorri Sturluson in Skáldskaparmál.

Hildr welcomed her father and offered him peace and a necklace on behalf of Heðinn. However, Hǫgni had already unsheathed his sword Dáinsleif, which gave wounds that never healed and like Tyrfing always killed a man once it had been unsheathed. A battle ensued and they fought all day and many died. In the evening Heðinn and Hǫgni returned to their camps, but Hildr stayed on the battle-field. She resurrected them with incantations and the fallen soldiers started to fight anew, and this went on until Ragnarök.

Sörla þáttr

Sörla þáttr is a short story in Flateyjarbok, a collection of tales about Norwegian kings written by two Christian priests in the 15th century, owned by a family from Flatey island. Sörla þáttr is about King Olaf I of Norway (Olaf Tryggvason), who was the first to encourage Christianity in Norway and Iceland.

The story borrowed parts of Heimskringla, parts of the poem Lokasenna (of Gefjon sleeping with a boy for a necklace), parts of the Húsdrápa poem (of Loki stealing Brisingamen), and the eternal battle Hjaðningavíg. In the end of the story, the arrival of Christianity dissolves the old curse that traditionally was to endure until Ragnarök.

Skíðaríma
In Skíðaríma, the war threatens to destroy Valhalla itself, and so Odin sends Thor to fetch Skíði, a pathetic beggar, so that he can stop the war. Skíði manages to stop the fight by asking to marry Hildr and she consents.

Gesta Danorum
Saxo Grammaticus relates that Hithinus was the prince of a Norwegian tribe and a small man. Hithinus fell in love with Hilda, the daughter of Höginus, a strongly built Jutish chieftain. Hithinus and Hilda had in fact been so impressed with each other's reputation that they had fallen in love before meeting.

In spring, Hithinus and Höginus went pillaging together, and Höginus betrothed his daughter to Hithinus promising each other that they would avenge one another if anything happened.

However, evil tongues spread the rumour that Hithinus had touched Hilda before the betrothal. Höginus believed the false rumour and attacked Hithinus, but Höginus was beaten and returned to Jutland.

King Frotho of Denmark tried to mediate, but had to decide that the matter be settled in a holmgang. During the combat Hithinus was seriously wounded, and started losing blood. Höginus decided to have mercy on Hithinus, because among the old Scandinavians it was considered shameful to kill someone who was weaker, and so Hithinus was taken home by his men.

After seven years, the two men started to fight again but both died from their wounds. But, Hilda loved both so much, so that she used spells to conjure up the dead each night, and so the battle went on and on.

Deor
The battle is alluded to in the Old English 10th century poem Deor. The poet explains that he served the Heodenings (people of Heðinn) until Heorrenda a more skilled poet replaced him:

The Heodenings and Heorrenda are probably mentioned in Deor to add a level of irony or humour. Being eternal, the tragedy of the Heodenings would not "go by".

Notes and references

Sources
Online publication of Gesta Danorum
Henrikson, Alf: Stora mytologiska uppslagsboken.
A translation of Sörla þáttr in English
A translation of the legend from Skáldskaparmál

Fictional battles
Events in Norse mythology
Heroes in Norse myths and legends
Sources of Norse mythology